The Chrysler Chronos is a concept car created by Chrysler in 1998. The Chrysler Chronos has a similarity in design to the 1953 Chrysler D'Elegance concept car as well as a similarity to the production model Chrysler 300C. Only one was produced and it did not go to mass production.

Description of the Chronos
The Chronos is equipped with a naturally aspirated 6.0L (366 ci) OHC V10 engine (built from three 4.7L V8's) with around 350 horsepower (58.3 bhp/Liter). The design of the concept has some similarity to the classic 1950s Virgil Exner-era cars. The Chronos has aluminum wheels, a huge wheelbase, and RWD.

References
ConceptCarz.com Info on the Chronos
Inside Chrysler Concept Cars: The Chrysler Chronos

Chronos
Retro-style automobiles